Govinda IV (reigned 930–935 CE) was the younger brother of Amoghavarsha II. He became the Rashtrakuta emperor in 930 as described in the Kalasa record of Chikmagalur. He was a very unpopular ruler who indulged in licentious acts. Control over Kannauj was lost during his rule. The Chalukyas of Vengi defeated him and much territory was lost. Finally, his own feudatories including King Arikesari of Vemulavada in Andhra revolted against him and placed Amoghavarsha III on the throne in 935. This is known from the records of Kannada poet Adikavi Pampa, who was patronised by King Arikesari. Govinda IV had matrimonial relationship with the Cholas of Kanchi and finally found refuge with them when his feudatories revolted. Govinda IV patronised Kannada poet Ravinagabhatta.

References

Notes

External links
 History of Karnataka, Mr. Arthikaje

Hindu monarchs
10th-century rulers in Asia
Rashtrakuta dynasty
935 deaths
Year of birth unknown